Mayes County is a county located in the U.S. state of Oklahoma. As of the 2010 census, the population was 41,259. Its county seat is Pryor Creek. Named for Samuel Houston Mayes, Principal Chief of the Cherokee Nation from 1895 to 1899, it was originally created at the Sequoyah Convention in August 1905.

History
According to the Encyclopedia of Oklahoma History and Culture, the area covered by what is now Mayes County has many prehistoric sites. There is evidence of human habitation dated before 6,000 B. C., plus 35 Archaic sites ( 6,000 B. C to 1 A. D.), 25 Woodland sites (1 A. D. to 1000 A. D.) and 31 Plains Village sites (1000 A. D. to 1500 A. D.

French voyageurs roamed the area in the early 18th Century, giving French names to many of the waterways and other local sites. Jean Pierre Chouteau established a trading post at the location of the present town of Salina, where he chiefly traded with the Osage tribe that had settled in the vicinity. Union Mission, near the present day town of Chouteau, Oklahoma was established in 1820. Rev. Samuel Worcestor set up the first printing press in this part of the United States at Union Mission in 1835.

In 1828, members of the Western Cherokee Nation began arriving in the area from their former lands in Arkansas. The Eastern Cherokee, who were forced from their homes in Tennessee, Georgia and North Carolina, followed during the 1830s. In 1841, the present Mayes County area became part of the Saline District of the Cherokee Nation.

This area of Oklahoma experienced some military activity during the Civil War. A 300-man Union Army force surprised an equally large Confederate unit near the present site of Locust Grove, Oklahoma in July 1862. The Union force prevailed and captured about one third of the Confederates, while the remainder escaped. In July 1863, Confederate General Stand Watie tried to capture a Union supply train headed to Fort Gibson. Federal forces under Colonel James Williams successfully defended the train and drove off  Watie's men. This action was thereafter known as the First Battle of Cabin Creek. In September 1864, General Watie and General Richard Gano did capture a Union supply train in the same location. This was named the Second Battle of Cabin Creek. Colonel James Williams led a detachment that recovered the wagon train in a skirmish near Pryor Creek. The Confederate force escaped.

After the Civil War, transportation improvements opened up the area's economy. The East Shawnee Trail, and early cattle trail followed the route of the Grand River. The Texas Road came through later. In 1871 to 1872, the Missouri-Kansas-Texas Railroad built its track through the present county. The Missouri, Oklahoma and Gulf Railway (later, the Kansas, Oklahoma and Gulf Railway) built a line in 1913 that joined the Katy system at Strang, Oklahoma.

Geography

The county is bisected by the Grand River. The eastern half of the county is on the Ozark Plateau, with flat areas divided by deep stream valleys. The western half is in the Prairie Plains.

The county contains several man-made major reservoirs, including:
 Lake Fort Gibson;
 Lake Spavinaw;
 Grand Lake o' the Cherokees;
 Lake Hudson;
 Salina Pumped Storage Project.

Lake Spavinaw is owned by the city of Tulsa and is the principal source of water for the city. The other three reservoirs were built by the Federal Government primarily for flood control and hydroelectric power generation. They are managed by the Grand River Dam Authority (GRDA). GRDA also manages the GRDA Coal-fired power generation station.

Major highways
  Interstate 44
  U.S. Highway 69
  U.S. Highway 412
  State Highway 20
  State Highway 28
  State Highway 82

Adjacent counties
 Craig County (north)
 Delaware County (east)
 Cherokee County (southeast)
 Wagoner County (south)
 Rogers County (west)

Demographics

As of 2010 Mayes County had a population of 41,259.  The racial and ethnic makeup of the population was 68.0% white, 0.4% black, 21.4% Native American, 0.4% Asian, 0.8% reporting some other race and 9.0% of the population reporting two or more races.  2.7% of the population reported being Hispanic or Latino of any race.

As of the census of 2000, there were 38,369 people, 14,823 households, and 10,820 families residing in the county.  The population density was 58 people per square mile (23/km2).  There were 17,423 housing units at an average density of 27 per square mile (10/km2).  The racial makeup of the county was 72.14% White, 0.30% Black or African American, 19.10% Native American, 0.28% Asian, 0.01% Pacific Islander, 0.62% from other races, and 7.55% from two or more races.  1.87% of the population were Hispanic or Latino of any race. 94.8% spoke English, 2.1% Cherokee, 1.4% Spanish and 1.2% German as their first language.

There were 14,823 households, out of which 32.60% had children under the age of 18 living with them, 60.20% were married couples living together, 9.00% had a female householder with no husband present, and 27.00% were non-families. 23.80% of all households were made up of individuals, and 11.10% had someone living alone who was 65 years of age or older.  The average household size was 2.55 and the average family size was 3.02.

In the county, the population was spread out, with 26.60% under the age of 18, 8.60% from 18 to 24, 26.20% from 25 to 44, 23.80% from 45 to 64, and 14.90% who were 65 years of age or older.  The median age was 37 years. For every 100 females there were 98.40 males.  For every 100 females age 18 and over, there were 95.40 males.

The median income for a household in the county was $31,125, and the median income for a family was $37,542. Males had a median income of $31,668 versus $20,573 for females. The per capita income for the county was $15,350.  About 11.20% of families and 14.30% of the population were below the poverty line, including 18.90% of those under age 18 and 10.90% of those age 65 or over.

Politics

Economy
Agriculture has long been the primary economic activity in the county. Important crops include: corn, soybeans, sorghum and hay. Cattle raising and dairy farming occur in the more rugged parts of the Ozark Plateau.

Heavy industry came to the county in 1941 with the creation of the government-owned Oklahoma Ordnance Works, a munitions manufacturing plant near Pryor. The plant, which had been operated by duPont, closed after the end of World War II, and remained vacant for many years. In 1960, the former munitions plant was converted into the MidAmerica Industrial Park, which included plants manufacturing paper, cement and fertilizer.

The Grand River Dam Authority (GRDA) is a major employer. It operates several hydroelectric plants and two coal-fired electric power generators in the county.

There is a Google data center in the county.

Communities

City
 Pryor Creek (county seat)

Towns

 Adair
 Chouteau
 Disney
 Grand Lake Towne
 Hoot Owl
 Langley
 Locust Grove
 Pensacola
 Salina
 Spavinaw
 Sportsmen Acres
 Strang

Census-designated places

 Ballou
 Cedar Crest
 Iron Post
 Kenwood
 Little Rock
 Mazie
 Murphy
 Pin Oak Acres
 Pump Back
 Rose
 Sams Corner
 Snake Creek
 Sportmans Shores
 Wickliffe

Other unincorporated community
 Boatman

NRHP sites

The following sites in Mayes County are listed on the National Register of Historic Places:
 Cabin Creek Battlefield, Pensacola
 Farmers and Merchants Bank, Chouteau
 Lewis Ross/Cherokee Orphan Asylum Springhouse, Salina
 Pensacola Dam, Langley
 Territorial Commercial District, Chouteau
 Union Mission Site, Mazie

References

 
1907 establishments in Oklahoma
Populated places established in 1907